Provornyy is a  of the Russian Navy.

Development and design 

Gremyashchiy-class corvettes are very large multipurpose vessels, designed to complement the Steregushchiy class already being commissioned with the Russian Navy. They have been designed to have an improved habitability for higher endurance missions, and are able to launch cruise missiles.

The class was designed with German MTU diesels for propulsion. However, because of sanctions arising from the Ukrainian conflict, deliveries of MTU diesels beyond the first two units were stopped, resulting in the cancellation of further units. Instead, new units of the preceding Steregushchiy class are being ordered. In May 2016, corvette Gremyashchiy got two Russian-made 16D49 diesel turbines 1DDA-12000 from Kolomna Plant in St Petersburg, replacing the previously required German MTU diesels.

Project 20385 differs from its predecessor by greater dimensions and displacement. They have a steel hull and composite superstructure, with a bulbous bow and nine watertight subdivisions. Compared with the Soobrazitelny, Boikiy, Sovershennyy and Stoikiy ships, which are fitted with Redut air defense VLS system of 12 launchers on the bow, these new ships are equipped with a UKSK VLS system comprising eight launchers for either Kalibr, Oniks or Zircon anti-ship/cruise missiles. The Redut VLS system with 16 launchers has been placed on the stern. Another difference is the lack of the aft mast above the helicopter hangar, and single integrated mainmast that no longer includes separate open shelves for artillery and navigation radars.

Construction and career 
Provornyy was laid down on 25 July 2013, and launched in November 2019 by Severnaya Verf in Saint Petersburg. The transfer of the corvette to the fleet had been scheduled for the end of 2022. The ship will become part of the Joint Forces Command in northeastern Russia and will be based in Kamchatka.

On 17 December 2021, Provornyy caught fire while being fitted out at Severnaya Verf, St. Petersburg. Nearly 170 firefighters were dispatched to deal with the incident, and it is reported that the fire covered almost the entire deck of the corvette. Three construction workers have been injured, with two of them being hospitalised. However, no fatalities have been reported, and there was no construction occurring at the time of the fire. Despite the fire's scale and intensity, the hull of Provornyy was not damaged. The destroyed superstructure, which will be dismantled, did not contain any equipment. Severnaya Verf has stated that they are conducting negotiations to build a new superstructure. It was subsequently reported that a rebuild of the ship might take five years.

References 

2019 ships
Ships built at Severnaya Verf